Henry Manners may refer to:

 Henry Manners, 2nd Earl of Rutland (1526-1563)
 Henry Manners, 8th Duke of Rutland (1852-1925), British politician